Bang Bua Station is a BTS Skytrain station, on the Sukhumvit Line in Bangkok, Thailand. It is located in front of the Bang Khen Main Campus of Sripatum University and Bang Bua School. The station is part of the northern extension of the Sukhumvit Line and opened on 5 June 2020, as part of phase 3.

See also 
 Bangkok Skytrain

References 

BTS Skytrain stations
Railway stations opened in 2020